Mary Hall ( – December 8, 1960), born Mary deLuce White, was an American stage actress who appeared on Broadway from 1901 to 1929. She was part of the Castle Square Theatre in Boston, and a leading lady with Boston's Empire Theatre and the Pike Theatre of Cincinnati. She took her stage name from her first marriage to Smith B. Hall, with whom she was mother of sportscaster Halsey Hall. She died in New York City at age 84.

Often billed as English due to early tours in London, she was born to judge Henry P. White and Euphemia deLuce of Kansas City, Missouri, in a family of a three children. She became a prominent social leader in Kansas City, and married newspaperman Smith B. Hall in 1895. The "statuesque brunette" was nominated queen of the Kansas City flower parade ("Kween Karnation") in 1896, and entered the stage the same year, in a production of In Old Kentucky in Toledo, Ohio. She divorced Hall and married Dr. Charles Tabb Pearce in 1904. She later married newspaperman and theatrical manager William Antisdel (who claimed they were never legally married), actor-manager Frederick E. Bryant, and the unemployment activist Urbain J. Ledoux.

References

External links

1870s births
1960 deaths
20th-century American actresses
American stage actresses
Actresses from Kansas City, Missouri
Social leaders